The 2018–19 Mountain West Conference men's basketball season began with practices in October 2018, followed by the start of the 2018–19 NCAA Division I men's basketball season in November. Conference play begins in January 2019 and concludes in February 2019. The season marks the 19th season of Mountain West Conference basketball.

Preseason

Coaching changes 
On February 26, 2018, Colorado State coach Larry Eustachy resigned after being placed on administrative leave. On March 22, Drake head coach and former CSU assistant coach Niko Medved was hired as the new head coach of Colorado State.

On March 12, 2018, Fresno State head coach Rodney Terry left Fresno State to become head coach at UTEP. He finished at Fresno State with a seven-year record of 126–108. On April 5, it was announced that the school had hired San Diego State assistant coach Justin Hutson as head coach.

On March 11, 2018, Utah State head coach Tim Duryea was fired after three seasons. He finished at Utah State with a three-year record of 47–49. On March 25, reports indicated that the school had hired South Dakota head coach Craig Smith as head coach, which was confirmed the next day.

Conference predictions

Predicted Mountain West results 
Source

Preseason Mountain West teams 

Source

Watchlists

Regular season

Conference matrix 
This table summarizes the head-to-head results between teams in conference play.

Postseason

Mountain West tournament

Notes and references